Bad Boys Best is a greatest hits album by Bad Boys Blue. It came out in 1989. The album contained a new song, "Hungry for Love", which was released as a single.

Track listing

Charts

Sales and certifications

References

External links 
 

1989 greatest hits albums
Bad Boys Blue albums